The Donegal Senior Football Championship (abbreviated as Donegal SFC) is an annual football competition organised by Donegal GAA and contested by the highest-level clubs, to determine the best team in County Donegal. Since 2016, it has been known as Michael Murphy Sports and Leisure Donegal SFC after its headline sponsor.

Initially a straight knock-out competition, the Donegal SFC added a round-robin group stage in 2013. The final is played at MacCumhaill Park in Ballybofey. The winning club qualifies to represent its county in the Ulster Senior Club Football Championship, the winners of which go on to compete in the All-Ireland Senior Club Football Championship.

The winning club receives the Dr Maguire Cup. The competition has been won by 17 clubs, 14 of which have won it more than once. Gaoth Dobhair and St Eunan's are the most successful clubs, with 15 titles apiece. The most recent team to win the competition for the first time is Glenswilly (2011, followed by 2013 and 2016). The reigning champion is Naomh Conaill, having defeated St Eunan's in the 2022 final.

History
The 1996 Donegal SFC has been described as "probably the greatest ever championship in Donegal", with Na Cealla Beaga playing nine games to lift the trophy that year.

The 1997 Donegal SFC descended into controversy when St Eunan's, having beaten Aodh Ruadh in the final by a scoreline of 1–11 to 2–7, had the title stripped from them — due to St Eunan's fielding Leslie McGettigan, an illegal player. The affair made the national press and its effects continued for many months, into the following year.

In 2002, Na Cealla Beaga were thrown out of the Donegal SFC at the semi-final stage — after also being accused of fielding an illegal player, with New York again at the centre of the dispute. The player — Peter McGinley — as well as the club's chairman and secretary were banned for one year. Assistant secretary Bernard Conaghan (reported the Irish Independent) said: "We were careful not to play this player until his papers came through from New York. We sat him out for a league game and our first Championship match, we did everything we thought possible to make sure he was legal and now this has happened, it's a terrible blow". The final of that competition was not played until 2003 due to a disagreement between Ard an Rátha and Naomh Adhamhnáin over Eddie Brennan.

In 2008, Termon — described in national newspaper the Sunday Independent as "one of the smallest if not the smallest" in the county — reached an SFC final for the first time in their history.

Jim McGuinness assisted Naomh Conaill to success in the 2000s before becoming an All-Ireland winning manager with Donegal. Naomh Conaill, as county champions, made it all the way to the final of the 2010 Ulster Senior Club Football Championship by defeating Cavan champions Kingscourt in the preliminary round, Monaghan champions Clontibret O'Neills in the first round proper, and Tyrone champions Coalisland in the semi-final.

Naomh Conaill were also involved in the 2020 Championship Final saga, which did not conclude until 2022.

Competition format
The old format, which involved a two-legged first round, was scrapped ahead of the 2013 Donegal SFC in favour of an opening round containing four groups of four teams played out as a league and one team relegated. Two of the four teams in each group advance to the (one-legged) quarter-finals after each have played the others once. The four winning quarter-finalists advance to the (one-legged) semi-finals and the winners advanced to the (one-legged) final.

Teams finishing bottom of their group play two relegation semi-finals. The losing relegation semi-final teams met in the relegation final. The losing team is relegated to the Donegal Intermediate Football Championship (Donegal IFC) to be replaced by the IFC-winning team.

The format was retained for 2014.

A "League Stage" was adopted for the 2020 competition due to the COVID-19 pandemic bringing play to a halt earlier, and restricting play later, in the year.

Qualification for subsequent competitions

Ulster Senior Club Football Championship
The Donegal SFC winners qualify for the Ulster Senior Club Football Championship. It is the only team from County Donegal to qualify for this competition. The Donegal SFC winners may enter the Ulster Senior Club Football Championship at either the preliminary round or the quarter-final stage. Teams to have qualified for the final of that competition include Na Cealla Beaga, Naomh Conaill, Glenswilly and Gaoth Dobhair.

All-Ireland Senior Club Football Championship
The Donegal SFC winners – by winning the Ulster Senior Club Football Championship – may qualify for the All-Ireland Senior Club Football Championship, at which they would enter at the semi-final stage. The last team from County Donegal to do this was Gaoth Dobhair in 2018; they were knocked out by reigning (and eventual) All-Ireland champions Corofin.

Winners and finalists

Results by team

Consecutive winners
Two clubs have completed a Donegal SFC four-in-a-row: these were Gaoth Dobhair (1944, 1945, 1946, 1947) and Naomh Iósaef/St Joseph's (1973, 1974, 1975, 1976).

Three clubs have completed a Donegal SFC three-in-a-row: these were Gaoth Dobhair (1953, 1954, 1955), Seán MacCumhaills (1962, 1963, 1964) and St Eunan's (2007, 2008, 2009).

Na Cealla Beaga have won consecutive Donegal SFCs on two occasions (1991, 1992 and 1995, 1996).

A merger between Aodh Ruadh and the less successful Réalt na Mara resulted in the formation of the hugely successful Naomh Iósaef/St Joseph's, who dominated Donegal club football in the 1960s and 1970s winning consecutive Donegal SFCs (1970, 1971) and a 'Four in a Row' between 1973 and 1976. Aodh Ruadh have won consecutive Donegal SFCs on their own on three occasions (1942 & 1943; 1986 & 1987; and 1997 & 1998).

Naomh Conaill, meanwhile, have established the unusual trend of winning the competition in every 21st-century year ending in "5" or "0", despite never having won it before that time.

Finals listed by year
(r) = replay  (aet) = after extra time

Media coverage

Domestic
Matches are covered live throughout the county on Highland Radio.

Some matches are also covered by Ocean FM (if they involve teams from its area) alongside its coverage of sport in the neighbouring counties of Sligo and Leitrim.

Newspapers such as the Donegal Democrat, Donegal News and Donegal People's Press provide extensive coverage of the competition.

Abroad
Live matches from the competition have been shown on Irish-language national television service TG4 as part of its GAA Beo programme. Highlights have been shown on the GAA... programme on Monday evenings on the same channel.

RTÉ began showing the Donegal SFC to English-language viewers on television in 2019.

With interest in the sport at an all-time high following the county's showing in the 2012 All-Ireland Senior Football Championship Final, the final of the 2012 Donegal SFC was broadcast live on TG4.

Coverage of the final may be found in newspapers such as The Irish Times, Irish Examiner and Irish Independent the following day.

Gradam Shéamuis Mhic Géidigh
A player of the year award has been given since 2016. Its title commemorates the RTÉ Raidió na Gaeltachta broadcaster Séamus Mac Géidigh. A committee of sports journalists decides the winner.

References

External links
 Official website of Donegal GAA
 Donegal at Hogan Stand
 Donegal Club GAA

 
Donegal GAA club championships
Senior Gaelic football county championships